Francesco Didioni (1839 –27 July 1895) was an Italian painter.

He was born in Milan, and died in Stresa.  He was influenced by Raffaele Casnédi. He painted mainly portraits, including historical subjects. His most prominent work was titled Ragione di stato depicting the divorce of Napoleon from Josephine.

Sources

1839 births
1895 deaths
People from Codogno
19th-century Italian painters
Italian male painters
Painters from Milan
19th-century Italian male artists